Sinodelphys is an extinct eutherian from the Early Cretaceous, estimated to be 125 million years old. It was discovered and described in 2003 in rocks of the Yixian Formation in Liaoning Province, China, by a team of scientists including Zhe-Xi Luo and John Wible.

Fossil record
 
Only one fossil specimen is known, a slab and counterslab given catalog number CAGS00-IG03. It is in the collection of the Chinese Academy of Geological Sciences.

Sinodelphys szalayi grew only 15 cm (5.9 in) long and possibly weighed about 30 g (1.05 oz). Its fossilized skeleton is surrounded by impressions of fur and soft tissue, thanks to the exceptional sediment that preserves such details. Luo et al. (2003) inferred from the foot structure of Sinodelphys that it was a scansorial tree-dweller, like its non-marsupial contemporary Eomaia and modern opossums such as Didelphis. Sinodelphys probably hunted worms and insects. Most Mesozoic metatherians have been found in North America and Asia. Most lived during the Late Cretaceous between 90 and 66 million years ago.

Evolution of marsupials
Sinodelphys szalayi, living in China around 125 million years ago, was initially interpreted as the earliest known metatherian. This makes it almost contemporary to the eutherian Acristatherium, which has been found in the same area. However, Bi et al. (2018) reinterpreted Sinodelphys as an early member of Eutheria.

See also
 Eomaia
 Evolution of mammals

References

Cretaceous mammals
Prehistoric metatherians
Early Cretaceous mammals of Asia
Transitional fossils
Fossil taxa described in 2003
Prehistoric mammal genera